Bixler may refer to: 

 Bixler High Private Eye, film
 Bixler Manufacturing Company
 Antley–Bixler syndrome

People 
Harris J. Bixler (1862-1930), US Congressman from Pennsylvania
Paul Bixler (1907-1985), American football coach
Litza Bixler (born 1970), film and commercial choreographer 
Cedric Bixler-Zavala (born 1974), singer and lyricist
Solon Bixler (born 1977), guitarist
Brian Bixler (born 1982), baseball player
Joshua bixler ( rc hobbyist send flitetest

See also 
 Bixley